Upton-by-Chester is a former station situated on the Chester–Birkenhead line which was built by the Chester and Birkenhead Railway. It was located by the Liverpool Road road bridge where it crossed the railway near Upton and not far from Moston.

History
It was opened on 17 July 1939 as Upton-by-Chester Halt by the Birkenhead Railway, which was jointly owned by the GWR and LMS railway companies. The station had two adjacent side platforms with a ticket office.

The station was established to serve the growing village of Upton and the surrounding area. During the Second World War, it also served Moston Military Hospital (now Dale Barracks, Chester).

On 6 May 1968 the word "Halt" was dropped from the station name.

Its former side platforms are overgrown but they can still seen from passing trains and Liverpool Road bridge (A5116).

Services

References

Further reading

External links
 Upton-by-Chester station on Subterranea Britannica disused stations site

Disused railway stations in Cheshire
Former Birkenhead Railway stations
Railway stations in Great Britain opened in 1939
Railway stations in Great Britain closed in 1984
1939 establishments in England
1984 disestablishments in England